This is a list of presidents of the Executive Council of the canton of Basel-Stadt. The canton of Basel-Stadt and city of Basel are government by a seven-member executive council (Regierungsrat). The executive council is chaired by its president (Regierungspräsident). The function used to rotate annually among the members, but has become a permanent role in 2009. The city of Basel doesn't have a government of its own or a mayor.

References 

Basel
 
Basel
Politics of Basel-Stadt